Graham Higman FRS (19 January 1917 – 8 April 2008) was a prominent English mathematician known for his contributions to group theory.

Biography
Higman was born in Louth, Lincolnshire, and attended Sutton High School, Plymouth, winning a scholarship to Balliol College, Oxford. In 1939 he co-founded The Invariant Society, the student mathematics society, and earned his DPhil from the University of Oxford in 1941.  His thesis, The units of group-rings, was written under the direction of J. H. C. Whitehead.   
From 1960 to 1984 he was the Waynflete Professor of Pure Mathematics at Magdalen College, Oxford.

Higman was awarded the Senior Berwick Prize in 1962 and the De Morgan Medal of the London Mathematical Society in 1974. He was the founder of the Journal of Algebra and its editor from 1964 to 1984. Higman had 51 D.Phil. students, including Jonathan Lazare Alperin, Rosemary A. Bailey, Marston Conder, John Mackintosh Howie, and Peter M. Neumann.

He was also a local preacher in the Oxford Circuit of the Methodist Church.  During the Second World War he was a conscientious objector, working at the Meteorological Office in Northern Ireland and Gibraltar.

He died in Oxford.

Publications
 
  
 Graham Higman (1966) Odd characterisations of finite simple groups, U. of Michigan Press
 *
 Graham Higman and Elizabeth Scott (1988), Existentially closed groups, LMS Monographs, Clarendon Press, Oxford

See also
Higman–Sims group, named after Donald G. Higman, but studied also by Graham Higman.
Higman's embedding theorem
Feit-Higman theorem
Higman group
Higman's lemma
HNN extension
Hall–Higman theorem

Notes

References
 
 Death notice, Oxford University Gazette, 17 April 2008

External links

1917 births
2008 deaths
20th-century English mathematicians
21st-century English mathematicians
Group theorists
Alumni of Balliol College, Oxford
Fellows of Magdalen College, Oxford
Fellows of the Royal Society
People from Louth, Lincolnshire
English conscientious objectors
British Methodists
Waynflete Professors of Pure Mathematics
Presidents of the London Mathematical Society